Wheelchair fencing at the 1960 Summer Paralympics consisted of three events.

Medal summary

References 

 

1960 Summer Paralympics events
1960
Paralympics
International fencing competitions hosted by Italy